John Edward Gunn (15 March 1863 – 19 February 1924) was an Irish-born prelate of the Roman Catholic Church. He served as Bishop of Natchez from 1911 until his death in 1924.

Biography

Early life and ordination
The oldest of eleven children, John Gunn was born on March 15, 1863, in Fivemiletown, County Tyrone, in Ireland to Edward and Mary (née Grew) Gunn. From 1875 to 1880, he studied at St. Mary's College in Dundalk, Ireland. He then attended the Marist House of Studies in Paignton, England (1880–1882) before furthering his studies in Rome at the Pontifical Gregorian University (1885–1890). While in Rome, Gunn made his profession in the Society of Mary on August 23, 1884.

Professor
Gunn was ordained to the priesthood in Rome by Patriarch Iulius Lenti on February 2, 1890.  He then returned to Dundalk to teach at St. Mary's.  In 1892, Gunn immigrated to the United States to teach moral theology at the Marist House of Studies at The Catholic University of America in Washington, D.C. 

In 1898,  Gunn was assigned to Atlanta, Georgia, to become pastor of the newly erected Sacred Heart Parish. The parish was already in debt when he arrived, as evidenced by an entry he made in his ledger upon is arrival: "September 25, 1898. Cash on hand $0.00. Advanced by Father Gunn, $150." In February 1899, he advanced the parish an additional $360 to meet expenses. He later purchased an organ and 21 stained glass windows; installed confessionals, furnace, carpeting, and a choir and organ gallery; covered the two towers with copper; and added a second story to the rectory. During his pastorate at Sacred Heart, he also founded and served as the first president of the Marist College, and established a parochial school.

Bishop
On June 29, 1911, Gunn was appointed the sixth bishop of the Diocese of Natchez by Pope Pius X. He received his episcopal consecration on August 29, 1911 from Archbishop James Blenk, with Bishops Edward Allen and John Morris serving as co-consecrators, at Sacred Heart Church. Upon Gunn's arrival that September, the diocese contained 75 churches, 46 priests, and 17,000 Catholics. He then began extensive pastoral visits to all the parishes and missions throughout the diocese, which covered nearly 47,000 square miles.

He received significant assistance from the Catholic Church Extension Society, and incorporated the diocese in 1918. He became known as the "Chapel Builder," and by the time of his death, there were 149 churches and over 31,000 Catholics in the diocese. In 1915, while attending the installation of Archbishop George Mundelein at Detroit, a German spy allegedly laced the soup at a banquet with arsenic, poisoning Gunn and four others, but Gunn survived. Following the end of World War I, he was considered for the Archdiocese of New Orleans, but he refused the efforts.

Death
By January 1924, his failing health left him in critical condition. John Gunn died on February 19, 1924, in Natchez, from a heart attack at age 60. He was buried beside his predecessor, Bishop Thomas Heslin. In his will, Gunn states, "In life and in death I am proud of three things: My Irish birth, my Catholic faith, and my American citizenship. I tried to translate my love for all three into service and sacrifice".

References

External links
 

1863 births
1924 deaths
20th-century Roman Catholic bishops in the United States
Catholic University of America faculty
Irish emigrants to the United States (before 1923)
Irish expatriate Catholic bishops
People from Fivemiletown
Pontifical Gregorian University alumni
Roman Catholic bishops in Mississippi
Roman Catholic Diocese of Jackson